The  is an art museum in Tokyo's Nihonbashi district. It is located within the Mitsui Main Building, an Important Cultural Property as designated by the Japanese government.

Collection
The museum's collection includes items used in the Japanese tea ceremony as well as Eastern antiques. Over 4,000 items collected by the Mitsui family since the Edo period of Japan are showcased within the museum.

Other Central Tokyo Museums
Mitsubishi Ichigokan Museum, Tokyo
Bridgestone Museum of Art
Idemitsu Museum of Arts

See also
 Mitsui family

References

External links 

 Mitsui Memorial Museum, Homepage

Nihonbashi, Tokyo
2005 establishments in Japan
Art museums and galleries in Tokyo
Art museums established in 2005
Buildings and structures in Chūō, Tokyo
Decorative arts museums
Mitsui